Albert Roca Pujol (born 20 October 1962) is a Spanish professional football manager and former footballer. He currently works as the technical consultant of the Indian Super League club Bengaluru FC.

Playing career
Born in Granollers, Barcelona, Catalonia, Roca spent most of his career with clubs in his native region, starting out at CE L'Hospitalet in the Segunda División B. In 1984 he signed for Real Zaragoza, being assigned to the B team also in that league and helping them promote to the Segunda División in his first season.

Roca's input at the professional level consisted of 75 games and three goals in the second tier with Zaragoza B, Atlético Madrid B and Palamós CF, and 31 matches and one goal in La Liga with Zaragoza and CE Sabadell CF. He scored his only goal in the latter competition on 8 March 1987, in a 3–1 away loss against RCD Español whilst playing for the latter side. 

Roca retired at the end of the 1991–92 campaign, aged 29.

Coaching career
Roca began working as a head coach in 1998, at CE Europa in the Tercera División. He won the Copa Catalunya against FC Barcelona, before switching to neighbouring club AEC Manlleu the following year.

In 2001, Roca joined Sabadell's coaching staff, leaving two years later for Barcelona under newly appointed Frank Rijkaard. The pair went on to work together at Galatasaray SK and the Saudi Arabia national team.

On 12 May 2014, Roca was appointed as manager of El Salvador. His first game in charge occurred on 4 June at the Toyota Stadium in Frisco, Texas, ending with a 1–2 friendly defeat to Ivory Coast. His first win came against the Dominican Republic in another exhibition match, on 30 August (2–0).

Roca returned to club duties on 6 July 2016, signing a two-year contract with I-League champions Bengaluru FC. They immediately proceeded to reach the final of the AFC Cup, becoming the first team in the country to achieve the feat but eventually losing 1–0 to Iraq's Al-Quwa Al-Jawiya. Subsequently, and still under his guidance, the side won the 2016–17 edition of the Federation Cup and reached the finals in the Indian Super League.

On 12 January 2020, Roca became head coach of Hyderabad FC also in the Indian top flight. He returned to Barcelona in August after agreeing to terminate his two-year contract, as fitness coach under newly appointed Ronald Koeman.

References

External links

FC Barcelona 06/07

1962 births
Living people
Footballers from Granollers
Spanish footballers
Association football defenders
La Liga players
Segunda División players
Segunda División B players
CE L'Hospitalet players
CE Sabadell FC footballers
Real Zaragoza B players
Real Zaragoza players
Atlético Madrid B players
Palamós CF footballers
Spanish football managers
Tercera División managers
CE Europa managers
Indian Super League head coaches
I-League managers
Bengaluru FC head coaches
Hyderabad FC managers
El Salvador national football team managers
2015 CONCACAF Gold Cup managers
Spanish expatriate football managers
Expatriate football managers in El Salvador
Expatriate football managers in India
Spanish expatriate sportspeople in Turkey
Spanish expatriate sportspeople in Saudi Arabia
Spanish expatriate sportspeople in El Salvador
Spanish expatriate sportspeople in India
FC Barcelona non-playing staff